John Reitz may refer to:
 John Augustus Reitz, American entrepreneur, industrialist and philanthropist
 John T. Reitz, American re-recording mixer